Byrsonima crassifolia is a species of flowering plant in the family Malpighiaceae, native to tropical America. Common names used in English include nance, maricao cimun, craboo, and golden spoon. In Jamaica it is called hogberry.

It's valued for its small (between one, and one and a quarter centimeter in diameter) round, sweet yellow fruit which is strongly scented. The fruits have a very pungent and distinct flavor and smell. When jarred, their texture resembles that of a green or kalamata olive.

Description and habitat
Sometimes cultivated for its edible fruits, the tree is native and abundant in the wild, sometimes in extensive stands, in open pine forests and grassy savannas, from central Mexico, through Central America, to Colombia, Peru, Bolivia and Brazil; it also occurs in Trinidad, Barbados, Curaçao, St. Martin, Dominica, Guadeloupe, Puerto Rico, Haiti, the Dominican Republic and throughout Cuba and the Isle of Pines. The nance is limited to tropical and subtropical climates. It is highly drought-tolerant.

Example ecoregions of occurrence
Found in a number of tropical and subtropical ecoregions of the Americas that feature conifers, an example ecoregion of occurrence for B. crassifolia is the Belizean pine forests.

Uses

The fruits are eaten raw or cooked as dessert. In rural Panama, the dessert prepared with the addition of sugar and flour, known as pesada de nance, is quite popular. The fruits are also made into dulce de nance, a candy prepared with the fruit cooked in sugar and water. In Nicaragua (where the fruit is called nancite), it is a popular ingredient for several desserts, including raspados (a frozen dessert made from a drink prepared with nancites) and a dessert made by leaving the fruit to ferment with some sugar in a bottle for several months (usually from harvest around August–September until December) -- this is sometimes called "nancite in vinegar".

The fruits are also often used to prepare carbonated beverages, ice cream and juice; in Brazil, to flavor mezcal-based liqueurs, or make an oily, acidic, fermented beverage known as chicha, the standard term applied to assorted beer-like drinks made of fruits or maize. Nance is used to distill a rum-like liquor called crema de nance in Costa Rica. Mexico produces a licor de nanche.
 In Veracruz, Mexico, it is called nanche and it is a common dessert element that can be found in the form of popsicles (percheronas) and ice sorbets (raspado).

Gallery

See also
 List of plants of Cerrado vegetation of Brazil
List of Culinary Fruits

References

External links

Purdue.edu: Byrsonima crassifolia

crassifolia
Tropical fruit
Flora of South America
Flora of Mexico
Plants described in 1822
Taxa named by Carl Sigismund Kunth